In mathematical analysis, a Hermitian function is a complex function with the property that its complex conjugate is equal to the original function with the variable changed in sign:

In physics, this property is referred to as PT symmetry. 

This definition extends also to functions of two or more variables, e.g., in the case that  is a function of two variables it is Hermitian if

From this definition it follows immediately that:  is a Hermitian function if and only if

Motivation 
Hermitian functions appear frequently in mathematics, physics, and signal processing.  For example, the following two statements follow from basic properties of the Fourier transform:

 
Since the Fourier transform of a real signal is guaranteed to be Hermitian, it can be compressed using the Hermitian even/odd symmetry.  This, for example, allows the discrete Fourier transform of  a signal (which is in general complex) to be stored in the same space as the original real signal.

 If f is Hermitian, then .

 If both f and g are Hermitian, then .

See also 

 
 

Types of functions
Calculus